The Fronde was a series of civil wars in France in 1648 to 1653.

Fronde may also refer to:
La Fronde (newspaper), a French feminist newspaper
French destroyer Fronde

See also 
 Frond, a large compound leaf
 Sling (weapon)
Thierry la Fronde, a French television series